The New York Quarterly (NYQ) was a popular contemporary American poetry magazine. Established by William Packard (1933-2002) in 1969, Rolling Stone magazine has called the NYQ "the most important poetry magazine in America."

History
After the death of William Packard in 2002, Raymond P. Hammond assumed control of the magazine.

Content
The NYQ was widely known for featuring poems and/or interviews with writers such as Carol Jennings, Charles Bukowski, W. H. Auden, Anne Sexton, Ted Kooser, Franz Wright, Karl Shapiro, Macdonald Carey, Richard Eberhart, Michael McClure, Robert Peters (writer) and Lyn Lifshin.  The magazine also regularly published work by emerging authors.

See also
List of literary magazines

References

External links
New York Quarterly Website
Listing at Duotrope's Digest
New York Quarterly on LitList

Poetry magazines published in the United States
Quarterly magazines published in the United States
Magazines established in 1969
Magazines published in New York City